Anton Gorelkin (born 22 January 1982, Kemerovo) is a Russian political figure and a deputy of 7th and 8th State Dumas. 

At the beginning of the 2000s, Gorelkin worked as a journalist and a correspondent for the TASS in the Kemerovo Region. In 2011, he started working for the Administration of the Kemerovo Oblast, where he worked as deputy governor. In 2016, he became the deputy of the 7th State Duma. In September 2021, he was re-elected for the 8th State Duma from the Kemerovo Oblast constituency.

Gorelkin is known for his support of implementing the sovereign internet. In 2019, he authored a bill that would restrict foreign ownership of internet resources that are recognized as being "significant" in the Russian Federation to 20%. However, the bill was not accepted in that version and was sent for a revision. Gorelkin re-introduced a new draft law in December 2020 that proposed limiting foreign shareholdings in Russian companies that offer online video streaming services to 20%. According to the suggested amendments, video services whose share of the Russian audience is less than 50% will be able to open representative offices in Russia. The project is planned to be considered in April 2022.

Gorelkin also actively supported the introduction of the single audience meter in Runet that would gather all the data on the audience of Internet media, audiovisual services, news aggregators and TV channels.

References

1982 births
Living people
United Russia politicians
21st-century Russian politicians
Eighth convocation members of the State Duma (Russian Federation)
Seventh convocation members of the State Duma (Russian Federation)